John Lamb, (28 February 1789 – 18 April 1850) was  an academic and Anglican priest in the first half of the nineteenth century:  a mathematician he was Master of Corpus Christi College, Cambridge from 1822 to 1837;  and Dean of Bristol from 1837 until his death.

He was born in  Ixworth and died in  Cambridge.

References

1789 births
People from Ixworth
Alumni of Corpus Christi College, Cambridge
Fellows of Corpus Christi College, Cambridge
Masters of Corpus Christi College, Cambridge
Deans of Bristol
1850 deaths
Cambridge mathematicians